In computer science, join-based tree algorithms are a class of algorithms for self-balancing binary search trees. This framework aims at designing highly-parallelized algorithms for various balanced binary search trees. The algorithmic framework is based on a single operation join. Under this framework, the join operation captures all balancing criteria of different balancing schemes, and all other functions join have generic implementation across different balancing schemes. The join-based algorithms can be applied to at least four balancing schemes: AVL trees, red–black trees, weight-balanced trees and treaps.

History
The join operation was first defined by Tarjan  on red–black trees, which runs in worst-case logarithmic time. Later Sleator and Tarjan  described a join algorithm for splay trees which runs in amortized logarithmic time. Later Adams  extended join to weight-balanced trees and used it for fast set–set functions including union, intersection and set difference. They also brought up parallelism in Adams' algorithm by using a divide-and-conquer scheme. In 2016, Blelloch et al. formally proposed the join-based algorithms, and formalized the join algorithm for four different balancing schemes: AVL trees, red–black trees, weight-balanced trees and treaps. In the same work they proved that Adams' algorithms on union, intersection and difference are work-optimal on all the four balancing schemes.

Join algorithms
The function join considers rebalancing the tree, and thus depends on the input balancing scheme. If the two trees are balanced, join simply creates a new node with left subtree , root  and right subtree . At this point a new node with left child , root  and right child  is created to replace c. The new node may invalidate the balancing invariant. This can be fixed with rotations.

The following is the join algorithms on different balancing schemes.

The join algorithm for AVL trees:
 function joinRightAVL(TL, k, TR)
     (l, k', c) := expose(TL)
     if h(c) ≤ h(TR) + 1
         T' := Node(c, k, TR)
         if h(T') ≤ h(l) + 1
             return Node(l, k', T')
         else
             return rotateLeft(Node(l, k', rotateRight(T')))
     else 
         T' := joinRightAVL(c, k, TR)
         T := Node(l, k', T')
         if h(T') ≤ h(l) + 1
             return T
         else
             return rotateLeft(T)
 
 function joinLeftAVL(TL, k, TR)
     /* symmetric to joinRightAVL */
 
 function join(TL, k, TR)
     if h(TL) > h(TR) + 1
         return joinRightAVL(TL, k, TR)
     else if h(TR) > h(TL) + 1
         return joinLeftAVL(TL, k, TR)
     else
         return Node(TL, k, TR)
Where:

  is the height of node . 
  extracts the left child , key , and right child  of node  into a tuple .
  creates a node with left child , key , and right child .

The join algorithm for red–black trees:
 function joinRightRB(TL, k, TR)
     if r(TL) = ⌊r(TR)/2⌋ × 2
         return Node(TL, ⟨k, red⟩, TR)
     else 
         (L', ⟨k', c'⟩, R') := expose(TL)
         T' := Node(L', ⟨k', c'⟩, joinRightRB(R', k, TR))
         if c' = black and T'.right.color = T'.right.right.color = red
             T'.right.right.color := black
             return rotateLeft(T')
         else
             return T'
 
 function joinLeftRB(TL, k, TR)
     /* symmetric to joinRightRB */
 
 function join(TL, k, TR)
     if ⌊r(TL)/2⌋ > ⌊r(TR)/2⌋ × 2
         T' := joinRightRB(TL, k, TR)
         if (T'.color = red) and (T'.right.color = red)
             T'.color := black
         return T'
     else if ⌊r(TR)/2⌋ > ⌊r(TL)/2⌋ × 2
         /* symmetric */
     else if TL.color = black and TR = black
         return Node(TL, ⟨k, red⟩, TR)
     else
         return Node(TL, ⟨k, black⟩, TR)
Where:

  of a node  means twice the black height of a black node, and the twice the black height of a red node. 
  extracts the left child , key , color , and right child  of node  into a tuple . 
  creates a node with left child , key , color , and right child .

The join algorithm for weight-balanced trees:
 function joinRightWB(TL, k, TR)
     (l, k', c) := expose(TL)
     if w(TL) =α w(TR)
         return Node(TL, k, TR)
     else 
         T' := joinRightWB(c, k, TR)
         (l1, k1, r1) := expose(T')
         if w(l) =α w(T')
             return Node(l, k', T')
         else if w(l) =α w(l1) and w(l)+w(l1) =α w(r1)
             return rotateLeft(Node(l, k', T'))
         else
             return rotateLeft(Node(l, k', rotateRight(T'))
 
 function joinLeftWB(TL, k, TR)
     /* symmetric to joinRightWB */
 
 function join(TL, k, TR)
     if w(TL) >α w(TR)
         return joinRightWB(TL, k, TR)
     else if w(TR) >α w(TL)
         return joinLeftWB(TL, k, TR)
     else
         return Node(TL, k, TR)
Where:

  is the weight of node .
  means weight  is heavier than weight  with respect to the α-weight-balance.
  extracts the left child , key , and right child  of node  into a tuple .
  creates a node with left child , key  and right child .

Join-based algorithms
In the following,  extracts the left child , key , and right child  of node  into a tuple .  creates a node with left child , key  and right child . "" means that two statements  and  can run in parallel.

Split
To split a tree into two trees, those smaller than key x, and those larger than key x, we first draw a path from the root by inserting x into the tree. After this insertion, all values less than x will be found on the left of the path, and all values greater than x will be found on the right. By applying Join, all the subtrees on the left side are merged bottom-up using keys on the path as intermediate nodes from bottom to top to form the left tree, and the right part is asymmetric. For some applications, Split also returns a boolean value denoting if x appears in the tree.

The split algorithm is as follows:

 function split(T, k)
     if (T = nil)
         return (nil, false, nil)
     else
         (L, m, R) := expose(T)
         if k < m
             (L', b, R') := split(L, k)
             return (L', b, join(R', m, R))
         else if k > m
             (L', b, R') := split(R, k)
             return (join(L, m, L'), b, R'))
         else
             return (L, true, R)

Join2
This function is defined similarly as join but without the middle key. The algorithm is as follows:

 function splitLast(T)
     (L, k, R) := expose(T)
     if R = nil
         return (L, k)
     else
         (T', k') := splitLast(R)
         return (join(L, k, T'), k')
 
 function join2(L, R)
     if L = nil
         return R
     else
         (L', k) := splitLast(L)
         return join(L', k, R)

Insert and delete
The insertion and deletion algorithms, when making use of join can be independent of balancing schemes. For an insertion, the algorithm compares the key to be inserted with the key in the root, inserts it to the left/right subtree if the key is smaller/greater than the key in the root, and joins the two subtrees back with the root. A deletion compares the key to be deleted with the key in the root. If they are equal, return join2 on the two subtrees. Otherwise, delete the key from the corresponding subtree, and join the two subtrees back with the root. The algorithms are as follows:

 function insert(T, k)
     if T = nil
         return Node(nil, k, nil)
     else
         (L, k', R) := expose(T)
         if k < k'
             return join(insert(L,k), k', R)
         else if k > k'
             return join(L, k', insert(R, k))
         else
             return T
 
 function delete(T, k)
     if T = nil
         return nil
     else
         (L, k', R) := expose(T)
         if k < k'
             return join(delete(L, k), k', R)
         else if k > k'
             return join(L, k', delete(R, k))
         else
             return join2(L, R)

Both insertion and deletion requires  time if .

Set–set functions
Several set operations have been defined on weight-balanced trees: union, intersection and set difference. The following recursive function computes this union:

 function union(t1, t2)
     if t1 = nil
         return t2
     else if t2 = nil
         return t1
     else
         (l1, k1, r1) := expose(t1)
         (t<, b, t>) := split(t2, k1)
         l' := union(l1, t<) || r' := union(r1, t>)
         return join(l', k1, r')

Similarly, the algorithms of intersection and set-difference are as follows:

 function intersection(t1, t2)
     if t1 = nil or t2 = nil
         return nil
     else
         (l1, k1, r1) := expose(t1)
         (t<, b, t>) = split(t2, k1)
         l' := intersection(l1, t<) || r' := intersection(r1, t>)
         if b
             return join(l', k1, r')
         else
             return join2(l', r')
 
 function difference(t1, t2)
     if t1 = nil
          return nil
     else if t2 = nil
          return t1
     else
         (l1, k1, r1) := expose(t1)
         (t<, b, t>) := split(t2, k1)
         l' = difference(l1, t<) || r' = difference(r1, t>)
         if b
             return join2(l', r')
         else
             return join(l', k1, r')

This complexity is optimal in terms of the number of comparisons. More importantly, since the recursive calls to union, intersection or difference are independent of each other, they can be executed in parallel with a parallel depth . When , the join-based implementation applies the same computation as in a single-element insertion or deletion if the root of the larger tree is used to split the smaller tree.

Build
The algorithm for building a tree can make use of the union algorithm, and use the divide-and-conquer scheme:

 function build(A[], n)
     if n = 0
         return nil
     else if n = 1
         return Node(nil, A[0], nil)
     else
         l' := build(A, n/2) || r' := (A+n/2, n-n/2)
         return union(L, R)

This algorithm costs  work and has  depth. A more-efficient algorithm makes use of a parallel sorting algorithm.

 function buildSorted(A[], n)
     if n = 0
         return nil
     else if n = 1
         return Node(nil, A[0], nil)
     else
         l' := build(A, n/2) || r' := (A+n/2+1, n-n/2-1)
         return join(l', A[n/2], r')
 
 function build(A[], n)
     A' := sort(A, n)
     return buildSorted(A, n)

This algorithm costs  work and has  depth assuming the sorting algorithm has  work and  depth.

Filter
This function selects all entries in a tree satisfying a predicate , and return a tree containing all selected entries. It recursively filters the two subtrees, and join them with the root if the root satisfies , otherwise join2 the two subtrees.

 function filter(T, p)
     if T = nil
         return nil
     else
         (l, k, r) := expose(T)
         l' := filter(l, p) || r' := filter(r, p)
         if p(k)
             return join(l', k, r')
         else
             return join2(l', R)

This algorithm costs work  and depth  on a tree of size , assuming  has constant cost.

Used in libraries
The join-based algorithms are applied to support interface for sets, maps, and augmented maps  in libraries such as Hackage, SML/NJ, and PAM.

Notes

References

External links
 PAM, the parallel augmented map library
 Hackage, Containers in Hackage

Binary trees